SRVHS may refer to:
 San Ramon Valley High School,  Danville, California, USA.
 Sree Rama Varma High School, Kochi, Kerala, India.
 SRV Higher Secondary School, Rasipuram, Tamil Nadu, India.